= Macedonian First Football League Reserves Championship =

Macedonian First Football League Reserves Championship is an annual competition for the reserve teams of Macedonian First Football League clubs.

== History ==
The competition was established in 2014.
